Lăpușnicel is a commune in Caraș-Severin County, western Romania with a population of 1,320 people. It is composed of three villages, Lăpușnicel, Pârvova (Porhó) and Șumița (Cseherdős).

References

Communes in Caraș-Severin County
Localities in Romanian Banat
Czech communities in Romania